Lost Soul Mountain is a summit in Lincoln County, Montana, in the United States.

References

Mountains of Lincoln County, Montana
Mountains of Montana